Kelly Cartwright  (born 22 April 1989) is an Australian athlete and powerlifter.  She won two medals at the London 2012 Paralympics, and represented Australia in the Beijing 2008 Paralympics.

Personal
Kelly Anne Cartwright was born on 22 April 1989 and is from Geelong. When she was fifteen she had a form of cancer called synovial sarcoma.  Part of her right leg needed to be amputated due to the cancer because chemotherapy was not an option. She has a prosthetic leg that she started using in high school. Her regular walking leg cost A$62,000 and needed to be charged every night. Before losing her leg she played netball. Cartwright climbed Mt Kilimanjaro in 2009.  she worked as a receptionist. She is also an ambassador for the Australian Paralympic Committee and Make-A-Wish Foundation. In 2012 she was named one of Zoo Weeklys sexiest Paralympian.

Cartwright appeared on the fifteenth season of Dancing with the Stars. In 2016 Cartwright and her partner, Ryan, became parents to a son.

Athletics
Cartwright is a T42 classified runner and is coached by Tim Matthews. In 2008, she was awarded a scholarship with the Australian Institute of Sport and in 2012 had a scholarship with the Victorian Institute of Sport.

Cartwright started competing in 2007 and first represented Australia in 2008 at the 2008 Beijing Paralympics. Making the 100-metre finals, she finished sixth racing on a carbon fibre leg. Going into the Games, she trained in Geelong. She competed in the 2011 IPC Athletics World Championships where she finished first while setting a world record in the 100 m event. At the 2012 Australian Athletics Championships, she set a world record of 16.26 seconds in the 100 m T42 event. In 2012 she was the world champion in the T42 100 m and long jump events. At the 2012 London Paralympics she won a gold medal in the Women's Long Jump F42/44 event and a silver medal in the Women's 100 m T42 event.

Powerlifting

Cartwright changed sports to para powerlifting due to a serious ankle injury after the 2012 Paralympics. She competed at the 2018 Commonwealth Games where she came 7th in the lightweight event.

Recognition
Cartwright was a finalist for the 2012 Australian Paralympian of the Year. She was awarded an Order of Australia Medal in the 2014 Australia Day Honours "for service to sport as a Gold Medallist at the London 2012 Paralympic Games."

Gallery

References

External links
 
 Kelly Cartwright at Australian Athletics Historical Results (archive)

1989 births
Living people
Australian female sprinters
Australian female long jumpers
Australian amputees
Sportspeople with limb difference
Amputee category Paralympic competitors
Paralympic athletes of Australia
Paralympic gold medalists for Australia
Paralympic silver medalists for Australia
Paralympic medalists in athletics (track and field)
Athletes (track and field) at the 2008 Summer Paralympics
Athletes (track and field) at the 2012 Summer Paralympics
Medalists at the 2012 Summer Paralympics
World record holders in Paralympic athletics
Sportspeople from Geelong
Sportswomen from Victoria (Australia)
Victorian Institute of Sport alumni
Recipients of the Medal of the Order of Australia
21st-century Australian women
20th-century Australian women
Powerlifters at the 2018 Commonwealth Games
Commonwealth Games competitors for Australia